Heva Coomans (1860–1939) was a Belgian  painter.

Coomans was born in Paris as the daughter of the painter Pierre Olivier Joseph Coomans (1816–1889) and Adelaide Lacroix (1838–1884). Her sister Diana Coomans was also a painter and her brother Oscar Coomans (1848–1884) was a poet. Like her father and sister, she painted romantic portrayals of the original inhabitants of Pompei before the eruption of Vesuvius, but also is known for depicting young women in other mythological or heroic scenes.

Coomans died in New York City.

References

External links

Heva Coomans on artnet

1860 births
1939 deaths
Artists from Paris
Belgian women painters
Sibling artists
19th-century Belgian painters
19th-century Belgian women artists
20th-century Belgian painters
20th-century Belgian women artists